Stanley Dell (born 31 October 1912 in Coventry, England - died 24 November 1950) was a speedway rider.

Career
Dell started his career at his local track at Coventry in 1932. When track close he moved to the West Ham Hammers and spent three seasons at the Custom House track. During 1936 he rode for Cardiff in the Provincial League and then moved onto the Hackney Wick Wolves, where he stayed until the outbreak of World War II, winning the National League Division II Championship in 1938. Whilst riding for a Hackney at West Ham he was involved in a crash that left him with a badly broken leg. Doctors thought an amputation would be needed but Dell refused and his leg was saved.

After the war he joined the Birmingham Brummies where he was awarded the captaincy. However, on 7 May 1949, Dell was involved in big crash with Vic Duggan and Arthur Payne. Dell was left with terrible injuries. Despite attempting a comeback in July 1949 he was clearly suffering from the effects of the crash.

He retired from racing at the end of that season and started a training school. The effects from the crash were still causing him health problems and further surgery was required. He did not reagin his health and died on 24 November 1950 aged just thirty eight.

References 

1912 births
1950 deaths
British speedway riders
English motorcycle racers
Hackney Wick Wolves riders
Coventry Bees riders
West Ham Hammers riders
Birmingham Brummies riders